Taseko may refer to:

 Taseko Lakes
 Taseko Mines
 Taseko Mountain
 Taseko River

See also
 Tŝilhqox Biny